Kemwer means "great black (one)" in the Egyptian language, and may refer to:
An epithet of Horus, who was viewed as a nature spirit with the qualities of a hawk
A description of the Mnevis bull